Charles Palmer (18 August 1869 – 14 November 1947) was an English sport shooter who competed at the 1908, 1912 and 1920 Summer Olympics for Great Britain.

In the 1908 Olympics he won a gold medal in the team trap shooting event and was fifth in the individual trap shooting event. Four years later, he won a silver medal in the team clay pigeons event and was 21st in the trap event.

References

External links
Charles Palmer's profile at databaseOlympics

1869 births
1947 deaths
British male sport shooters
Trap and double trap shooters
Olympic shooters of Great Britain
Shooters at the 1908 Summer Olympics
Shooters at the 1912 Summer Olympics
Shooters at the 1920 Summer Olympics
English Olympic medallists
Olympic gold medallists for Great Britain
Olympic silver medallists for Great Britain
Olympic medalists in shooting
Medalists at the 1908 Summer Olympics
Medalists at the 1912 Summer Olympics